Consolation is the name of a former Dutch death metal/grindcore band from the Zaanstreek  that formed in 1989. They released three full-length albums through Displeased Records and were called the Dutch "Gods of Grind"; at their peak, in the late 1990s, they were one of the highest rated metal bands in the Netherlands, according to Dutch metal magazine Aardschok.

The band split up in 1999. They more or less restarted in 2002 as Cardinal, playing shows as late as 2005. A real comeback under their old name came in late 2008, when they announced reunion shows at the end of 2008 and the beginning of 2009.

Discography
Unnamed (demo, 1990)
Beautyfilth (Album, Displeased Records, 1993)
Hardcore Leeft (split with Nembrionic Hammerdeath and Osdorp Posse, 1994)
The Truth (EP, Displeased, 1994)
Brave Melvin from the Southern Point (Album, Displeased, 1995)
Stahlplaat (Album, Displeased, 1998)

Members
 Dennis Jak (founder) - guitar, vocals
 Toep Duin - drums
 Manoloxx - vocals (- 1996)
 Rein Schorel - bass
 Arjan van Exter - vocals (1998- )
 Robert van der Mijle - guitar, vocals

References

Dutch heavy metal musical groups
Dutch death metal musical groups
Musical quintets
Musical groups established in 1989
Musical groups disestablished in 1999
Musical groups reestablished in 2002
Musical groups disestablished in 2005
Musical groups reestablished in 2008